Lalino Stone Arch Bridge is a historic stone arch bridge located near Middleville in Herkimer County, New York. It was constructed in 1870 and spans Perkosky brook a tributary of Maltanner Creek, which empties into West Canada Creek.  It is 35 feet long and has a single arch with a span of 23 feet and rise of eight feet, six inches.

It was listed on the National Register of Historic Places in 2001.

References

Road bridges on the National Register of Historic Places in New York (state)
Bridges completed in 1870
Bridges in Herkimer County, New York
National Register of Historic Places in Herkimer County, New York
Stone arch bridges in the United States
1870 establishments in New York (state)